Campbell's Kingdom is a 1952 thriller novel by the British writer Hammond Innes. A British man, ill and largely inactive since the Second World War, inherits land in the Canadian Rockies. He travels there to investigate his grandfather's instinct that there are valuable oil reserves under the land.

Innes wrote about his travels in Canada to research Campbell's Kingdom in Chapter 5 of his non-fiction book Harvest of Journeys (1960).

Film adaptation
In 1957, the book was made into a British film of the same name directed by Ralph Thomas and starring Dirk Bogarde, Stanley Baker, Michael Craig, and Barbara Murray.

References

Bibliography
 Goble, Alan. The Complete Index to Literary Sources in Film. Walter de Gruyter, 1999.

1952 British novels
Novels by Hammond Innes
British thriller novels
British novels adapted into films
Novels set in Canada
William Collins, Sons books